Coway Co., Ltd.is an international manufacturer of household appliances, water purifiers and water softeners from South Korea. Founded and headquartered in Seoul, Coway is the largest water purifier company in the country and owns subsidiares in China, Indonesia, Malaysia, Thailand, and the United States. The company is listed on the Korea Exchange and is a subsidiary of Netmarble since 2019.
subsidiaries
The company produces bidets, water purifiers and softeners, and air purifiers. Recently, Coway is also focusing on the bedding products, such as mattress.

History 
Woongjin Group founded the company under the name Woongjin Coway in 1989.

Amid financial concerns, Woongjin Group sold its majority shares in Coway to the private equity fund MBK Partners in 2013, which remained the holding company of Coway until 2018.

Woongjin briefly reacquired its shares from MBK in late 2018 for 1.68 trillion won (1.4 billion dollars), renaming the company back to Woongjin Coway in the process. However, their shares in Coway were put in auction less than a year later. Initially, companies such as Carlyle Group, Haier Group and SK Networks placed bids, but all eventually withdrew. The bid was later sold to video game developer Netmarble for 1.74 trillion won, despite Woongjin initially attempting to sell its shares for more than 2 trillion. Netmarble remains the largest holding company of Coway to the present day.

Coway Malaysia 
Coway Malaysia is a subsidiary company of Coway mainly responsible for distributing Coway products in Malaysia. The subsidiary was founded in May 2006, with an initial investment of 5.8 million Malaysian ringgits. Coway Malaysia is the largest subsidiary of the parent company, making up over 90% of its overseas revenue, amounting to over 140 billion won (128 million dollars) in 2017.

Controversies 
In 2016, three of Coway's ice cube maker models were discovered to leak trace amounts of nickel into its water. Allegedly, the company attempted to hide the defect from customers for a year. Coway was forced to recall models from an estimated 87 thousand customers in 2016, and several clients moved to file lawsuits against the company. Coway's CEO at the time, Kim Dong-hyun, was brought to resign from his position following the controversy as well.

References

External links 
 

1989 establishments in South Korea
Companies based in Seoul
Electronics companies of South Korea